Garczyński is a Polish coat of arms. It was used by several szlachta families in the times of the Polish–Lithuanian Commonwealth.

History

Blazon

Notable bearers

Notable bearers of this coat of arms include:
Stefan Garczyński
Basil Garczynski

See also 

 Polish heraldry
 Heraldry
 Coat of arms
 List of Polish nobility coats of arms 

https://books.google.co.uk/books?id=8Evq_EL62WwC&pg=PA235&lpg=PA235&dq=garczynski+szlachta&source=bl&ots=DfO5Nf60Ox&sig=OTeYZZBVd0qg59fys9ruKaRdreY&hl=en&sa=X&ved=0CCYQ6AEwBGoVChMIldLJtI-KyAIVzNcaCh1F5Anj#v=onepage&q=garczynski%20szlachta&f=false

Related coat of arms 

 Sas coat of arms

Polish coats of arms